was a town located in Niihari District, Ibaraki Prefecture, Japan.

As of 2003, the town had an estimated population of 30,218 and a density of 196.50 persons per km². The total area was 153.78 km².

On October 1, 2005, Yasato was merged into the expanded city of Ishioka.

External links
 Ishioka official website 

Dissolved municipalities of Ibaraki Prefecture
Ishioka, Ibaraki